The Turkey men's national under 20 ice hockey team is the national under-20 ice hockey team of Turkey. The team is controlled by the Turkish Ice Hockey Federation, a member of the International Ice Hockey Federation. They first played at the World Junior Championship in 1998, mainly staying at the Division III level.

History
Turkey played its first game in 1997 against the Netherlands during the Pool D tournament of the 1998 IIHF World U20 Championship. Turkey lost the game 32–1. The following year Turkey again competed in the Pool D tournament of the IIHF World U20 Championships. Turkey lost all four of their games including the one against the Netherlands which they lost 37–0. The loss to the Netherlands was recorded as their worst ever defeat in international competition. 

In 2003 Turkey returned from a three-year absence to compete in the Division III tournament at the 2003 IIHF World U20 Championship. They won their first game ever in their first game back, defeating Luxembourg 14–1. In 2006 Turkey recorded their largest ever win in international competition after defeating Armenia 28–3 during the 2006 IIHF World U20 Championship Division III tournament. Turkey continued to compete in Division III of the IIHF World U20 Championships until 2009 where they did not participate in that year's tournament. 

In 2010 Turkey returned to the World U20 Championships and hosted the Division III tournament in Istanbul. In 2012 they finished fifth in the Division III tournament being held in Dunedin, New Zealand.

International competitions

World Junior Ice Hockey Championships

References

External links
Turkish Ice Hockey Federation 

Junior national ice hockey teams
Junior men's
Youth ice hockey in Turkey